The Primetime Emmy Award for Outstanding Hosted Nonfiction Series or Special is handed out annually at the Creative Arts Emmy Award ceremony. The award was called Outstanding Informational Series or Special from 2013 until 2019, and was also presented from 1978 to 1998. From 1998 until 2012, informational series competed in Outstanding Nonfiction Series.

Beginning in 2020, the Academy of Television Arts & Sciences renamed the category to reflect that it recognizes "personality-driven programs in which the host drives the show's narrative; includes documentaries, travelogues, segmented/magazine program and interview formats."

Winners and nominations

1970s

1980s

1990s

Between 1998–2012, informational series competed in Outstanding Nonfiction Series.

2010s

2020s

Programs with multiple wins

6 wins
 Anthony Bourdain: Parts Unknown 

2 wins
 Leah Remini: Scientology and the Aftermath
 Nature
 Smithsonian World
 Stanley Tucci: Searching for Italy

Programs with multiple nominations
Totals are for nominees since 2013 and include nominations for Outstanding Documentary or Nonfiction Series and Outstanding Unstructured Reality Program.

18 nominations
 Inside the Actors Studio

9 nominations
 Vice

7 nominations
 Anthony Bourdain: Parts Unknown

5 nominations
 United Shades of America with W. Kamau Bell

4 nominations
 Leah Remini: Scientology and the Aftermath
 My Next Guest Needs No Introduction with David Letterman
 StarTalk with Neil deGrasse Tyson

2 nominations
 Comedians in Cars Getting Coffee
 Stanley Tucci: Searching for Italy
 The World According to Jeff Goldblum

Notes

References

Informational Series or Special
American reality television series